Srednji Globodol is a small settlement in the Municipality of Mirna Peč in southeastern Slovenia. The area is part of the historical region of Lower Carniola. The municipality is now included in the Southeast Slovenia Statistical Region. 

Evidence of an early Roman period burial ground has been discovered near the settlement.

References

External links
Srednji Globodol on Geopedia

Populated places in the Municipality of Mirna Peč